Huma Qureshi (born 1986) is an Indian actress.

Huma Qureshi may also refer to:
 Huma Qureshi (journalist), freelance journalist
 Huma Qureshi, former director of the Pakistan Health Research Council